Kiala is a village in Khyber-Pakhtunkhwa province of Pakistan. It is located at 34°2'0N 73°15'0E with an altitude of 1267 metres (4160 feet).

References

Villages in Khyber Pakhtunkhwa